The Old Spring Tavern is located in Madison, Wisconsin. It was added to the National Register of Historic Places in 1974.

History
The tavern was built by Connecticut native Charles Morgan. In 1860, Morgan sold the tavern to James W. Gorham. The building is the oldest structure within the Nakoma Historic District.

References

Commercial buildings on the National Register of Historic Places in Wisconsin
Drinking establishments on the National Register of Historic Places
Buildings and structures in Madison, Wisconsin
Greek Revival architecture in Wisconsin
Commercial buildings completed in 1854
Taverns in Wisconsin
Hotel buildings on the National Register of Historic Places in Wisconsin
1854 establishments in Wisconsin
National Register of Historic Places in Madison, Wisconsin